The 1988 Junior Pan American Rhythmic Gymnastics Championships was held in Salinas, Puerto Rico, August 8, 1988.

Medal summary

Junior division

Children's division

References

1988 in gymnastics
Pan American Gymnastics Championships
International gymnastics competitions hosted by Puerto Rico